Panayır can refer to the following places in Turkey:

 Panayır, Bigadiç
 Panayır Island